Multrå transmitter is a facility for FM-/TV-broadcasting near Sollefteå in Sweden.

It uses a guyed mast, which was built in 1964.

On February 7, 1988 the pinnacle collapsed as result of excessive icing. The lower parts of the mast remain standing and were repaired afterwards.
T

The ruins of the pinnacle is today a monument close to the transmission site.

See also 
 List of tallest structures in Sweden

References

External links 
 http://andersthorenbildblogg.blogg.se/2012/may/solleftea-multra-sla-monument.html
 

Transmitter sites in Sweden